Bulletin of the AMS could refer to:
Bulletin of the American Mathematical Society, published the American Mathematical Society
Bulletin of the American Meteorological Society, published by the American Meteorological Society
 Bulletin of the Australian Mathematical Society, published by the Australian Mathematical Society